Han Htoo  is a Burmese lawyer who previously served as the Advocate General of Yangon Region. He was removed from his position following corruption charges on 14 September, 2018

Arrested under section 55 of the Anti-Corruption Law

On 13 September 2018, Han Htoo and five other officials including a judge, law officers and a police officer were arrested under bribery charges filed by the Anti-Corruption Commission of Myanmar for accepting more than 70 million kyats (nearly US$46,300) to drop the case against three suspects in the murder of actor Yell Htwe Aung.

References

Living people
21st-century Burmese lawyers
Attorneys general
Year of birth missing (living people)
Place of birth missing (living people)